Actinotrophon fragilis is a species of sea snail, a marine gastropod mollusk in the family Muricidae, the murex snails or rock snails.

Description

Distribution

References

  Houart R. & Héros V. (2016). New species and records of deep water muricids (Gastropoda: Muricidae) from Papua New Guinea. Vita Malacologica. 15: 7–34

fragilis
Gastropods described in 1996